Konstantinos Bantas (born 9 July 1976) is a Greek former professional footballer who played as a defender.

Career
Born in Karditsa, Bantas began playing football for Anagennisi Karditsa in 1994, where he played over 100 games, scoring eight goals along the way. Bantas left for Trikala F.C. in 1999, where he stayed until 2001, when he joined Panachaiki. A spell at AE Poseidon Neon Poron followed in 2003, before he joined Akratitos F.C. in 2004, helping them to achieve promotion to the top flight for 2005. During his career, Bantas has made over 230 first team appearances, although most of his clubs have been outside of the Greek top division.

References

External links
Profile at epae.org
Profile at Onsports.gr

1976 births
Living people
Footballers from Karditsa
Greek footballers
Anagennisi Karditsa F.C. players
Trikala F.C. players
Panachaiki F.C. players
A.P.O. Akratitos Ano Liosia players
Panetolikos F.C. players
Association football defenders